The Microphones is an American indie folk, indie rock, and experimental band, founded and fronted by Phil Elverum. The band has released 5 studio albums, 13 miscellaneous albums, 3 extended plays, and 8 singles. Elverum began the Microphones initially as a solo project, releasing cassette demos of tests and experiments. Between 1996 to 1998, Elverum released four demos, mostly on Bret Lunsford's label Knw-Yr-Own. The CD Tests, released in June 1998, was a compilation album comprising tracks from previous cassettes. The same year, the band released the 7" single "Bass Drum Dream". The band's first studio album, Don't Wake Me Up, was released on K Records in August 1999 and gave the band a small following. Two more 7-inches were released in 1999: "Feedback (Life, Love, Loop)" and "Moon Moon".

The extended play Window: was released in February 2000. In September 2000, the studio album It Was Hot, We Stayed in the Water was released on K, solidifying Don't Wake Me Up'''s sound. The Glow Pt. 2 was released on K in September 2001; it went on to become a cult classic and Elverum's most critically acclaimed album. The same month, Blood was released, a limited-copy compilation album. Two 7-inches were released in 2001: "The Moon" and "I Can't Believe You Actually Died", the former included on The Glow Pt. 2. 

The single compilation album Song Islands was released in August 2002, and the limited-copy album Little Bird Flies Into A Big Black Cloud was released in September 2002. The 7-inch "Lanterns/Antlers" was also released in 2002, and was included on Song Islands. In 2003, the studio album Mount Eerie was released, along with two extended plays consisting of stems from the album: The Singing from Mt. Eerie and The Drums from Mt. Eerie. Mount Eerie is a concept album that portrays a linear storyline. After the release of Mount Eerie, Elverum retired the Microphones pseudonym and opted to release his music under Mount Eerie instead, as the themes of his music had changed.

There were some sparse releases during the Microphones' hiatus: the live album Live in Japan in 2004; the B-sides album The Glow Pt. 2 (Other Songs & Destroyed Versions) in 2007; the 7-inch "Don’t Smoke/Get Off the Internet" in 2007; an appearance on a collaborative single in 2011; and the 2016 compilation album Early Tapes, 1996-1998, made of selections from the early demos. In August 2020, Elverum returned to the Microphones name with the studio album Microphones in 2020, an autobiographical concept album consisting of one 44-minute song. The limited-copy album Foghorn Tape was released in March 2021, consisting of an ambient foghorn recording. In February 2022, Completely Everything, 1996 - 2021 was released, a compilation box set of the five Microphones studio albums, Early Tapes, and Song Islands. Elverum has implied that the box set is the end of the Microphones, which would make Microphones in 2020'' the band's final studio album.

Albums

Studio albums

Miscellaneous albums

Extended plays

Singles

References and notes

Notes

Citations

Sources

Discographies of American artists
Rock music discographies